The Abu'l-Fida Mosque is an Ayyubid-era mosque in Hama, Syria, located on the banks of the Orontes river. The mosque was erected by Abu'l-Fida in 1326.

See also
 Islam in Syria

Ayyubid mosques in Syria
Mosques in Hama
Architecture in Syria
14th-century mosques
Religious buildings and structures completed in 1326